Drama of Exile is the fifth studio album by German musician Nico. It was initially released in 1981. The second release followed in 1983 which was a re-recording of the first one done in May 1981. The album featured a Middle Eastern rhythm section and was produced by Corsican bassist Philippe Quilichini. This was Nico's only album not to feature John Cale.

Background 
After the release of The End... in 1974, Nico's partnership with Island Records ended, and for the next year, she spent the majority of her time in New York City without a recording contract. During that time, she appeared in a series of Philippe Garrel films.

Nico continued to write new songs and perform intermittently. "Purple Lips," featured in her solo sets as early as March 1975, was also performed on French television in April 1975. Its lyrics were recited by Nico in the Philippe Garrel film, Le Berceau de Cristal (1976). The earliest performance of "Genghis Khan" was recorded on August 6, 1975, and "Henry Hudson" began appearing in setlists in February 1977.

By March 1978, after "The Sphinx" was also introduced into her set, Nico titled the album Drama of Exile and attempted a new style at odds with her previous harmonium-based sound. Nico continued to write and had enough songs ready to record the album in 1981.

Recording and release 
In 1981, executive producer Nadette Duget, Philippe Quilichini's girlfriend, lived together with Nico in London. Duget had heroin connections and supported her own mild drug consumption, as well as Quilichini's and Nico's more serious addictions.

Aura Records offered to finance one album recorded in London and produced by Philippe Quilichini. Contracts were drawn up, Aura advanced the production costs, and recording began almost immediately in April or May 1981. Recorded at Gooseberry Studios in Tulse Hill, London, with a band composed of Quilichini, French-Iranian guitarist, oriental string instrument expert Muhammad Hadi, drummer Steve Cordonna, Ian Dury's saxophone player Davey Payne, percussionist J.J. Johnson of Wayne County's Electric Chairs, and Andy Clark who previously played keyboards on David Bowie's Scary Monsters (And Super Creeps) album. Sessions were attended by French journalist Bruno Blum, a friend of J.J. Johnson's, who later published the inside story in French rock magazine Best.

The original album was plagued by suspicious circumstances. There are different versions of the story, and the truth remains ambiguous. With the album nearly finished and following a disagreement over money, Aaron Sixx, the head of Aura at the time, allegedly received a tip-off from the studio that Nadette Duget (Nico's unofficial manager) had arranged to steal the master tapes from the studio and sell them without reimbursing Aura, but since Sixx had a signed contract with Duget and Quilichini, Sixx was able to take possession of all the multitrack, unmixed tapes. A legal battle ensued which reportedly lasted almost three years.

Duget claimed Nico had not signed the contract which was true, but since Aura had paid out considerable sums in production costs, they owned the recordings.

Second recording and release 
Duget, Quilichini, and photographer Antoine Giacomoni moved to a Linden Gardens basement flat in Notting Hill Gate, London. Violin player Thierry Matioszek was added to the lineup. Nico then recorded "Sãeta" and "Vegas," also produced by Quilichini which was released on the London Flicknife Records label in 1981. Supported by Nico and the musicians, Duget and Quilichini began recording the entire Drama of Exile album again.

Meanwhile, a mix of the unfinished first recording of the Drama of Exile album was released by Aaron Sixx on the Aura Records label in late 1981, with the date written on the back cover. This was allegedly done without the consent of Nico or the musicians and producers. The album cover was reported to have illegally used an Antoine Giacomoni color photograph. Furthermore, some of the musicians and mixing engineers were allegedly not credited, but Philippe Quilichini was still credited as producer.

Completed over the summer at Music Works studio in London, the second recording of the album was mixed by producer Quilichini and released a few months later on the Paris indie label Invisible Records. This version of the album features photographs taken by Matioszek and Giacomoni of Nico, her son Ari, and Quilichini on the inner sleeve. The album cover was a large, black "N" with a white background and a nod to Corsican French emperor Napoleon who ended his life in exile. According to Bruno Blum's 1982 review, the new version was well mixed and unquestionably superior. It also included two extra tracks, "Sãeta" and "Vegas".

False stories of the Aura label having released the only official album with Nico's consent and of Quilichini having secretly copied the first version of the album tapes to remix later emerged:
 

The re-recorded album was mixed by the original producer Philippe Quilichini and issued on Invisible Records in the spring of 1982. Deeply hurt by the legal battle and the fate of his work, Philippe Quilichini became involved with heroin and died in 1983. Nadette Duget left London permanently and flew back to Corsica where she died of anorexia a few months later. This left Aaron Sixx to further release the incomplete first version in the Netherlands and Sweden only with Nico's permission several months after the debacle with the masters. The original version of the LP was released on CD for the first time in Germany by Line Records in 1988. Shortly after, Nico died.

The album was released in England by Great Expectations Records in 1989 and in the United States by Cleopatra Records in 1993.

The original recording received mixed reviews from critics. AllMusic gave the album three out of five stars. Rolling Stone gave a mostly favorable review, while Trouser Press received the album poorly.

Musical style 
Drama of Exile has been described as "a tentative foray into post-punk". In The New Rolling Stone Album Guide, the author writes, "Drama of Exile pairs [Nico] with a thin new wave band that wouldn't have sounded out-of-place on, say, Rough Trade." Nico and the album were covered in Dave Thompson's book on gothic rock, The Dark Reign of Gothic Rock.

Track listing

Drama of Exile (1981)

The Drama of Exile (1983)

Personnel 
 Nico – vocals

 Drama of Exile

 Muhammad Hadi (Mad Sheer Khan) – lead guitar, fretless bouzouki, snitra, backing vocals, piano
 Philippe Quilichini – bass, African percussions, rhythm guitar, synthesizer, backing vocals
 Steve Cordona – drums
 J. J. Johnson – percussion, trumpet
 Davey Payne – saxophone
 Andy Clark – organ, piano, synthesizer

 The Drama of Exile

For the remake, the lineup was the same but without Davey Payne, and with additional help from:

 Thierry Matioszek – electric violin, backing vocals
 Gary Barnacle –  saxophones, drums

References

External links 
  (1981)
  (1982)

1981 albums
Nico albums